Downsize This! Random Threats from an Unarmed American is a book by the American author,  documentary filmmaker and activist Michael Moore.

The book is a look at the state of business and industry in the United States and the power they hold over the U.S. government.  In particular, the book focuses its criticism on corporations who care more for shareholders than the safety and wellbeing of the communities who work for them.  The book is part of Moore's ongoing campaign for increased corporate accountability.

The book was first published in hardback in 1996 and later published in paperback in 1997.

Moore refers to corporations receiving government tax breaks as "corporate welfare mothers".  There is also a chapter about Hillary Clinton as well as two on O. J. Simpson - one where Moore claims OJ was innocent of the murders of Nicole Brown Simpson and Ronald Goldman, another where Moore claims OJ was guilty. And yet another chapter where Moore details his unsuccessful endeavors to have State Representative from the 46th District of California, Bob Dornan, involuntarily committed for psychiatric evaluation.

References 

 Downsize This!, Michael Moore, Perennial,

External links 
 
 Reviews and selected chapters 

1996 non-fiction books
Business books
Books by Michael Moore
Books about the United States
Books about politics of the United States
Pan Books books

de:Michael Moore#Querschüsse